Adrian Falub (born 8 July 1971) is a Romanian football manager and former player.

Club career
Falub started to play football at Unirea Dej in the 4'th Romanian league. In 1989, he was transferred to the Liga I team U Cluj where he played 9 consecutive seasons. In 1996 Adrian Falub was sold to FC Basel because of the financial difficulties of the club. 

Falub joined Basel's first team for their 1996–97 season under heas coach Karl Engel. He played his domestic league debut for his new club in the home game in the St. Jakob Stadium on 4 September 1996 as Basel were defeated 2–4 by Lausanne-Sport. Falub did not adapt successfully to the Swiss lifestyle and after only one year, he returned to his beloved team U Cluj. During his short time with the club Falub played a total of 35 games for Basel scoring one goal. 24 of these games were in the Nationalliga A, three in the Swiss Cup and the other eight were friendly games. He scored his only goal during the test games.

In 1998 Falub moved to Gloria Bistriţa and one year later he was transferred to FC Naţional București. The Romanian defender played 4 seasons for FC Naţional București and in 2002 he went abroad, to the Cypriot side Digenis Akritas Morphou.

Coaching career
In 2006 Falub accepted the offer to become coach of U Cluj and left Digenis Akritas Morphou. He managed to promote the team in Liga I, 3 weeks before the final lap of the championship. Unfortunately, Adrian Falub's team had a very bad start in the 2007–2008 season and he was fired after 10 matches without victory. In 2008 Falub signed a contract with the Liga II team, Sportul Studenţesc. In 35 matches played under Falub's command, Sportul achieved 8 victories, 12 draws and 15 losses. He has terminated the contract with the Bucharest team on 17 May 2009. In April 2009 Adrian Falub signed a contract with FC Unirea Alba Iulia, helped the team to promote in Liga I. 
In the autumn of 2010 Falub joined CSMS Iaşi. 
In the winter transfer window he brought to the team Bogdan Ghiceanu and Claudiu Tudor amongst others. His contract was terminated in the summer of 2011..On 14th of February 2022, Adrian Falub signed a contract with CS Gloria Bistrița-Năsăud with the goal to promote the team to Liga II.

Honours

Player
Universitatea Cluj
Divizia B: 1991–92

Coach
Universitatea Cluj
Liga II: 2006–07
Liga III: 2017–18
Unirea Alba Iulia
Liga II: 2008–09
FCM Târgu Mureș
Liga II: 2009–10

References

Sources
 Rotblau: Jahrbuch Saison 2017/2018. Publisher: FC Basel Marketing AG. 
 Die ersten 125 Jahre. Publisher: Josef Zindel im Friedrich Reinhardt Verlag, Basel. 
 Verein "Basler Fussballarchiv" Homepage

External links
 
 Adrian Falub's coaching career in Liga I at Labtof.ro 

1971 births
Living people
People from Dej
Romanian footballers
FC Unirea Dej players
FC Universitatea Cluj players
FC Basel players
ACF Gloria Bistrița players
FC Progresul București players
Digenis Akritas Morphou FC players
Liga I players
Swiss Super League players
Cypriot First Division players
Romanian expatriate footballers
Expatriate footballers in Cyprus
Romanian expatriate sportspeople in Cyprus
Expatriate footballers in Switzerland
Romanian expatriate sportspeople in Switzerland
Romanian football managers
FC Universitatea Cluj managers
CSM Unirea Alba Iulia managers
FC UTA Arad managers
FC Sportul Studențesc București managers
FC Politehnica Iași (2010) managers
ASA 2013 Târgu Mureș managers
CS Concordia Chiajna managers
LPS HD Clinceni managers
CS Gloria Bistrița-Năsăud football managers
Romanian expatriate football managers
Association football defenders